Miss Madison is an H1 Unlimited hydroplane team. It is the only community-owned unlimited hydroplane in the world. It is based out of Madison, Indiana, a small town of 12,000 residents on the Ohio River which annually hosts the Madison Regatta. The story of the boat and city are the subject of the 2001 film Madison.

Since late of the 2019 season, they field two boats, the U-6 Miss HomeStreet, and the other the U-91 Miss Goodman Real Estate.

History
The team was started in 1960 when industrialist Samuel F. Dupont donated one of his hydroplanes to the town in 1961 to be run in the American Power Boat Association races. The town's boat is registered as "U-6" (for APBA Unlimited class, #6) in high-points unlimited hydroplane racing since 1961, which makes them the longest-running team in the sport, although the team will change numbers if required by H1 Unlimited regulations that state the defending national champion use the U-1 designation.  Through 2008 the U-6 team has used only 7 different hulls, although number 6 was used for only one race in 1988 when the new 5th Miss Madison hull crashed at San Diego in 1988.  The Miss Madison team leased the U-3 Risley's hull from owners Ed Cooper, Sr., and Ed Cooper, Jr., for the final race of the year in Las Vegas. The U-3 was officially the U-6 Miss Madison at this one event. The 2nd-to-last hull was built in 1988 by Ron Jones Marine in Seattle, Washington. The hull was first used as a piston-engined boat powered by a V-12 Allison aircraft engine. It was later redesigned for a Lycoming turbine engine, the same type of engine used in the Chinook helicopters. The championship winning U-1 Miss HomeStreet sponsored racing hull was built in 2007 for the H1 Unlimited hydroplane series.  A new U-6 debuted in 2018.  It was originally built in 2003 but was never completed following Bernie Little's death.  That hull was acquired by HomeStreet in 2017 and debuted at the end of the 2018 season.  During the 2019 season, the team ran two boats, with the 2007 hull as the U-1918 (for sponsor Oberto Specialty Meats' founding year) and the 2018 hull as the U-6.  The second hull was renamed after a sponsorship and management deal, it is now known as the U-91 Miss Goodman Real Estate.

Hulls

Wins
The Miss Madison had only a handful of wins in its history prior to joining the H-1 Unlimited series. The team has won ten (2008-10, 2012, 2014-17, 2019, 2021) National High Point Championships for the racing season. The single biggest individual victory occurred in 1971, when the Gold Cup (the World Series of hydroplane racing) was held in Madison for the first time. U-6 went on to win the Atomic Cup in Tri-Cities, Washington, that same year, and finished second nationally in overall points for the 1971 season.

Other major victories occurred when she won in 2001 and 2010 in Madison for the home town fans. Miss Madison has won in Guntersville, Alabama in 1965, Lake Ozark, Missouri in 1983, San Diego, California in 1993, Thunder on the Ohio in Evansville, Indiana in 2005, and the Columbia Cup in Tri-Cities, Washington in 2008 and 2009. Two wins in 2007 coming in Seattle at the Seafair Cup, and San Diego, California.

National High Point Championships

Gold Cup Championships

Sponsorship
As with any racing team, sponsors have been important to keep teams running. Miss Madison has had many title sponsors through the years. Many of them have been large companies. The boat, racing under the official number U-6, started out as just the Miss Madison and remained that way for a very long time. Sponsorships became a big part of the team after 1988 when the new hull was beginning its racing career. Miss Madison has been sponsored by Mazda, Holset, Kelloggs Frosted Flakes, Jasper Engines and Transmissions, DeWalt Tools, Oberto Sausage Company. HomeStreet Bank began sponsorship starting in 2016.  Oberto returned for selected races in 2019 for the second hull.  Goodman Real Estate took over in 2021 for selected races, and the team became full-time in 2022.

History of Miss Madison Sponsors
Hamm's Beer	
1975
Miss Lynnwood	
1976
Armstrong's Machine	
1977
Starvin Marvin	
1977
Dr. Toyota	
1980
Frank Kenney Toyota	
1981-82
Miss Rich Food Plan Service	
1982-83
American Speedy Printing	
1984-85
The Ching Group	
1985
Holset Miss Madison	
1986-90
Holset Miss Mazda	
1989-90
Kellogg's	
1992-94
Jasper Engines & Transmissions	
1995
DeWalt Tools	
1995-97
Powerball
1998
Oberto Beef Jerky	
2000–15, 2019 (U-1918)
Homestreet Bank
2016-present (U-6)
Goodman Real Estate
2022-present (U-91)

Sponsors by Year and Hull

from http://www.namba.com

Drivers

Drivers of Miss Madison since 1961.

References

External links
Official website; Retrieved January 18, 2007
, Retrieved January 18, 2007
Official website; Retrieved July 15, 2014

H1 Unlimited
Racing motorboats
Hydroplanes